Nineteen ships of the Royal Navy have been named HMS Lion or HMS Lyon, after the lion, an animal traditionally associated with courage, and also used in several heraldric motifs representing England, Scotland and the British Monarchy.  Another ship was planned but never completed:

  was a 36-gun ship of the Royal Scottish Navy captured in 1511 and sold in 1513.
  was a 50-gun ship built in 1536 and on the navy list until 1559.
  was the Scottish ship , captured in 1547 and later lost off Harwich.
  was a 40-gun ship, also known as Golden Lion. She was rebuilt four times, in 1582, 1609, 1640 and 1658. After her 1609 rebuild she was renamed Red Lion, but this was reverted to Lion after the 1640 rebuild.  She was sold in 1698.
  was a 6-gun ketch, also known as Young Lion.  She was captured from the Dutch in 1665, sold in 1667, repurchased in 1668 and sunk as a foundation at Sheerness in 1673.
  was a fifth rate captured from the Algerians in 1683 and sold the same year.
  was a 4-gun stores hoy of 99 tons burthen purchased in 1702. A French privateer captured her off Beachy Head in 1708, but she was recaptured in 1709.
  was a 4-gun hoy launched in 1709. She was wrecked in 1752.
  was a 60-gun third rate launched in 1709, rebuilt in 1738 and sold in 1765.
  was a transport launched in 1753, hulked in 1775, and sold in 1786.
  was a hoy sold in 1786
  was a cutter purchased in 1763 and sold in 1771.
  was a discovery vessel in service from 1774 to 1785.
  was a 64-gun third rate launched in 1777. She was used as a sheer hulk from 1816 and was sold for breaking up in 1837.
  was a schooner purchased around 1781 and sold in 1785.
  was a 4-gun gunvessel, originally a Dutch hoy.  She was purchased in 1794 and sold in 1795.
  was the pirate schooner Gata, built in Baltimore in 1820, that the Royal Navy captured in 1823 and took into service. She took part in numerous expeditions against pirates, recaptured some of their prizes, and captured a slave ship. The Navy sold her in 1826.
  was an 80-gun second rate launched in 1847.  She was converted to screw propulsion in 1859 and became a training ship after 1871. She was sold for breaking up in 1905.
  was a  launched in 1910 and sold in 1924.
She was laid down in 1939, but work was suspended later that year, and again in 1942. The order was finally cancelled in 1945 and she was broken up on the slipway.
  was a  launched in 1944 as the  HMS Defence.  She was finally completed to a revised design in 1960.  She was placed in reserve in 1964 and was scrapped in 1975.

Battle honours
Ships named Lion have earned the following battle honours:

Armada, 1588
Cadiz, 1596
Kentish Knock, 1652
Portland, 1653
Scheveningen, 1653
Lowestoft, 1665
Four Days' Battle, 1666
Orfordness, 1666
Schooneveld, 1673
Texel, 1673
Barfleur, 1692
Ushant, 1747
Santa Dorotea, 1798
Guillaume Tell, 1800
Java, 1811
Heligoland, 1914
Dogger Bank, 1915
Jutland, 1916

See also
 
 Lyon's Whelp
 
 HM Hired armed cutter

Citations and references 
Citations

References
 

 

Royal Navy ship names